Richard Paul Ashcroft (born 11 September 1971) is an English singer and songwriter. He was the lead singer and occasional rhythm guitarist of the alternative rock band The Verve from their formation in 1990 until their original split in 1999. Songs he wrote for the band include "Bitter Sweet Symphony", "Lucky Man", and the UK number one "The Drugs Don't Work". He became a successful solo artist, releasing three UK top three solo albums. The Verve reformed in 2007 but again broke up by summer 2009. Ashcroft then founded a new band, RPA & The United Nations of Sound, and released a new album on 19 July 2010. Ashcroft released his fourth solo album, These People, on 20 May 2016. Ashcroft went on to release the album “Natural Rebel” in 2018, and the compilation of acoustic versions of his best hits: “Acoustic Hymns Vol.1” in 2021.

In May 2019, Ashcroft received the Ivor Novello Award for Outstanding Contribution to British Music from the British Academy of Songwriters, Composers, and Authors. Chris Martin of Coldplay has described Ashcroft as "the best singer in the world".

Early life
Ashcroft was the only son of office worker Frank and hairdresser Louise Ashcroft (née Baxter); he also has two younger sisters. His middle name, Paul, is also the name of a paternal uncle. When Ashcroft was 11, his father died suddenly of a brain haemorrhage. Ashcroft soon "fell under the influence of his stepfather", who belonged to the Rosicrucians.

Ashcroft attended Up Holland High School in West Lancashire, along with future bandmates Simon Jones, Peter Salisbury and Simon Tong, and then attended nearby Winstanley College, where he met Nick McCabe. His teachers referred to him as "the cancer of the class", though one member of staff recalled him being "incredibly intelligent". Ashcroft was an avid football player, playing junior football for Wigan Athletic. For some time, Ashcroft wanted to be a professional football player, idolising George Best, but as he grew older he lost interest in this, turning to music instead.

The Verve

Ashcroft formed The Verve (originally just Verve) in 1990 with McCabe, Jones, and Salisbury. The band signed to Hut Records and became well known for their appetite for both psychedelic music and drugs. They also became a part of the Britpop movement. The band split in 1995, and around this time Ashcroft wrote a collection of songs he intended to release as his first solo album. However, by 1997 he had changed his mind and asked McCabe to return (alongside new member Tong), reforming the Verve and releasing the very successful album Urban Hymns. Ashcroft was at the forefront of the band's popularity, receiving an Ivor Novello Award for his songwriting and being referred to by the press as "the unmistakable face of the Number One rock band in England". However, the pressures of touring and the tensions within the band led to McCabe's departure in mid-1998 and the announcement of the band's break-up in April 1999.

In early 2007, Ashcroft made peace with McCabe and Jones and the Verve's reunion was announced in June. The band played gigs later that year and continued touring in 2008, headlining at several festivals around the world. A new album, Forth, was released in August.

In August 2008, the Verve broke up for the third time, though it was not announced until the following year.

Solo career

Alone with Everybody and Human Conditions: 2000–2004
Ashcroft's first solo single, "A Song for the Lovers", peaked at No. 3 in the UK charts in April 2000. It was followed by the single "Money to Burn" which reached the UK Top 20 at No. 17. The album, Alone with Everybody, was released in June, reaching number 1 and receiving platinum status in the UK. Album reviews were generally positive. In September, a third single was released – "C'mon People (We're Making It Now)" – entering the charts at No. 21. Richard does not publish the lyrics to his songs in the inlay cards of his albums or singles as he feels they are personal to him.

Ashcroft began work on his second album Human Conditions in 2002. The lead single, "Check the Meaning", was released in early October, and peaked at No. 11 on the UK Singles Chart. The album was released later that month and reached No. 3 in the UK Album Chart. Reception to the album was generally positive. Review aggregating website Metacritic reports a normalised score of 61% based on 15 reviews. In response to negative reaction to the album, Coldplay's Chris Martin – a fan of both Ashcroft and the Verve – defended the album's merits which "made an impression" on Ashcroft. The appreciation shown would later result in a support slot for Ashcroft, serving as the opening act for Coldplay during a European tour. The album's second single, "Science of Silence", was released the following January and charted at No. 14 in the UK. On 26 March, Ashcroft made his first live appearance of 2003 at London's Royal Albert Hall as part of the third annual Teenage Cancer Trust charity fundraising event, before "Buy It in Bottles", the third and final single to be taken from the album, was released on 7 April, charting at No. 26.

Aside from a limited number of appearances in 2003, Ashcroft was absent from the music business for about two years. He later explained this in 2006, stating that "[e]veryone got it into their heads over the last few years that I was in my ivory tower like Lennon, baking bread all day. The fact of the matter was that I was bringing up kids".

Live 8 and Keys to the World: 2005–2007

Ashcroft began playing gigs again in mid-2005, and, on 2 July at the Live 8 concert in Hyde Park, Coldplay invited him to perform with them during their set. They performed the Verve's hit "Bitter Sweet Symphony", after having previously rehearsed the song in Crystal Palace.  Ashcroft's performance of the song was introduced by Chris Martin as "the best song ever written, and here's the best singer in the world", helping to create renewed interest in Ashcroft.  At Christmas 2005, a documentary entitled Live 8: A Bitter Sweet Symphony was aired on the BBC reliving moments of the day featuring a portion of Ashcroft's performance as the show's opening soundtrack.

After the disintegration of Hut Records in 2004, Ashcroft signed to Parlophone where he released his third solo album, Keys to the World, on 23 January 2006. The first single from the album, "Break the Night with Colour", was released on 9 January 2006, and entered the UK Singles Chart at number 3. Following his performance at Live 8, Ashcroft was booked as a support act for Coldplay's Twisted Logic Tour throughout North America and the UK, which started on 14 March in Ottawa, Canada.  Ashcroft saw the support slot as "a good chance to play to a significant amount of people and say, 'I’m back. And this is what I do'".

The album's second single, "Music Is Power", charted at number 20. On 18 April 2006, he recorded the Live from London EP, the ninth in a series of EPs released exclusively as digital downloads from Apple's iTunes Store. The EP was released just 6 days later on 24 April. With the release of Keys to the World, the general consensus was that Ashcroft was "back at the top of his musical game", as he announced his largest UK tour for years for May 2006, culminating in three nights at London's Brixton Academy. Following the tour, Ashcroft had hoped to perform two "Homecoming" shows at Wigan Athletic's 25,000 seater JJB Stadium in June 2006, but was unable to do so as the proposed venue lacked the "appropriate licence". As a consequence, he chose to play at Lancashire County Cricket Club in Old Trafford, in what was to be his biggest solo show to date. He was supported at the gig by acts such as Razorlight and the Feeling, whilst DJ Shadow joined Richard on stage during his set to perform "Lonely Soul", their UNKLE collaboration from 1998's Psyence Fiction LP. Another UK tour followed five months later, culminating in a show at Manchester's M.E.N. Arena on 30 November. Ashcroft did not tour Keys to the World outside of Europe.

Ashcroft hinted at the possible release of a new version of his previous single "C'mon People (We're Making It Now)" for the Bobby Moore Cancer Fund, which would coincide with England's participation in the 2006 Football World Cup, but the single never materialised. Instead, his next release was "Words Just Get in the Way", which charted lower than his previous single, peaking at No. 40 in the UK Singles Chart. On 4 December, the double a-side "Why Not Nothing" / "Sweet Brother Malcolm" was released on limited edition 7" vinyl.

RPA & The United Nations of Sound, These People, Natural Rebel: 2009–present
Ashcroft is contractually obligated to record another album for Parlophone. Ashcroft played a solo gig on 25 August 2008 as part of the Last Days of Summer Festival in Buckingham. The Verve broke up for a third time sometime between the last rehearsals in late 2008 and the summer of 2009. It was announced in August 2009 by a band's friend.

A b-side compilation was considered a possibility, as Richard's team has asked the fans through his site about their feelings on such an album, but it's now very unlikely. In December 2009, Richard contributed the lead soundtrack song for the documentary The Journey. A video of the song was posted at Ashcroft's site. Also, through his blog BRAIN, he stated that he would release a new album in 2010. Sources revealed he worked on a number of new songs in New York, Los Angeles and London with producer No I.D., who Richard sought after because he liked his work in the Jay-Z song "D.O.A. (Death of Auto-Tune)" and read an interview where he states how many producers destroy records to boost sales.

Ashcroft is currently working with a new band called RPA & the United Nations of Sound, who have released a promo single from the album called "Are You Ready?". The album "United Nations of Sound" (former working title "Redemption") and the first proper single "Born Again" were released on 19 July 2010. The full album leaked on 15 July and the NME started streaming the album the following day. The new sound seems to emulate many of Richard's influences described over the years in interviews and seems to close a circle for his solo career. Strings, beats, rock-guitar-riffs, voice-loops, ballads and heroic-choir-anthems are the core of the album's sound with Ashcroft's craft for pop tunes and unique melody-making. Also found in the songs are the ever-present spiritual lyrics for Richard, although here in fuller form.

On 15 October 2010, Ashcroft released through his website a second fanclub-only track, "Here We Go Again". On the same day the song "Are You Ready?" was released as the first official single from the new album in the United States.<ref name="Are You Ready? 0124">{{cite web|title=The single "Are You Ready?" was released today in the US iTunes Music store|website=Facebook |date=16 October 2010|access-date=16 October 2010|url=http://www.facebook.com/posted.php?id=7217833667&share_id=125290484191766&comments=1}}</ref> During the same month Ashcroft had signed with the record company Razor & Tie in the United States. The radio edit of "Are You Ready?" is available for free on the US version of Richard's website.

The album United Nations of Sound was released across the Atlantic on 22 March 2011 under the name "Richard Ashcroft" and the lead single "Are You Ready?" was featured over the closing credits of the film The Adjustment Bureau in March 2011, along with the new song "Future's Bright", written and performed specifically for the film's opening by Richard and ten-time Oscar-nominated composer Thomas Newman.

For the US release of "Are You Ready?", Richard Ashcroft and Big Life Management commissioned Giorgio Testi for the promo – to be created out of live footage from a show at Shepherd's Bush Empire. The video premiered on 7 February on the official website of Pulse Films, the production company.

On 1 March the song "Future's Bright" was premiered on Stereogum. On the official website of the movie The Adjustment Bureau there is also a video created for the song by director George Nolfi.

After six years' absence, Ashcroft released his comeback fifth studio album, These People, in May 2016. The album received largely positive reviews from music critics. The album was followed by 2016 UK and Europe tour, an abbreviated North American tour, and—for the first time in Ashcroft's career—festival dates in Latin America.

In January 2018, it was confirmed that in June 2018, Ashcroft would be supporting Liam Gallagher at his two concerts in Malahide Castle and Gardens in Dublin and Belsonic at Ormeau Park in Belfast. In March 2018, it was announced that Ashcroft would tour with Gallagher in North America in May 2018. On 11 June 2018, it was announced that Ashcroft would support Gallagher at his show at Lancashire County Cricket Club on 18 August 2018.

In August 2018, Ashcroft announced his sixth solo album, Natural Rebel, which was released October 19, preceded by the single "Surprised By The Joy" in September and subsequent teasers "Born To Be Strangers" and "That's When I Feel It." The LP debuted at #4 on the UK album charts.

On February 17, 2021, Richard Ashcroft posted on facebook a new single would be released on Friday, February 19. When the single was released it was a cover of John Lennon’s "Bring On the Lucie (Freda Peeple)" (track 5 on Lennon's 1973 album Mind Games).

On 29 October 2021, Ashcroft released his sixth album Acoustic Hymns Vol. 1. It features acoustic versions of Ashcroft's songs with The Verve and his solo career.

Personal life
Ashcroft is married to Kate Radley, a former member of Spiritualized. They married in 1995 and it was years before it was publicly revealed that the pair had married. Together, they have two sons: Sonny, born in 2000, and Cassius, born in 2004. The family lives in Taynton in Gloucestershire and Richmond in London. Ashcroft is a Manchester United fan, and regularly attends matches.

He is good friends with Oasis's Noel Gallagher, Liam Gallagher and Coldplay's Chris Martin. For a long time the Gallagher brothers have expressed great respect for Ashcroft, with Noel Gallagher fondly nicknaming Ashcroft 'Captain Rock'. The Oasis track "Cast No Shadow", from the successful 1995 album (What's the Story) Morning Glory? is dedicated to him, possibly as a response to Ashcroft having dedicated the title track of A Northern Soul to Noel Gallagher. Ashcroft also provided backing vocals on the Oasis song "All Around the World" in 1997, for Oasis' Be Here Now.

In a 2006 interview, Ashcroft mentioned taking Prozac to help him with clinical depression, but said that it did not help, referring to the pills as "very, very synthetic." Ashcroft has said that he's always been "a depressive, someone who suffers from depression", and that music and creativity help him cope with his illness.

Controversies
Controversy exists over the Verve's biggest hit, "Bitter Sweet Symphony", on which Ashcroft is the sole band member to share a co-writing credit. The song uses a sample of Andrew Oldham Orchestra's recording of The Rolling Stones' 1965 song "The Last Time". The Verve had negotiated this legally; however, the Rolling Stones' record company successfully sued and argued that they had used "too much." The Verve was subsequently forced to give ABKCO 100 percent of the royalties from "Bitter Sweet Symphony", and Mick Jagger and Keith Richards were given songwriting credits along with Ashcroft. On 23 May 2019, Ashcroft announced that Jagger and Richards had signed over the rights to him. He now has sole writing credit, and will receive all future royalties.

On 19 June 2006, Richard Ashcroft was arrested in Wiltshire after bursting into a youth centre and asking to work with the teenagers present at the club. He began swearing and refusing to leave so employees called the police, resulting in Ashcroft being arrested and receiving an £80 fine for disorderly behaviour.

In July 2021, Ashcroft pulled out of the headline slot at Sheffield's Tramlines Festival after it became part of the UK government's pilot events programme.

Awards and nominations

{| class=wikitable
|-
! Year !! Awards !! Work !! Category !! Result
|-
| rowspan=2|1998
| Ivor Novello Awards
| rowspan=2|Himself 
| Songwriter of the Year
| 
|-
| Denmark GAFFA Awards
| Best Foreign Songwriter
| 
|-
| rowspan=2|2000
| Mercury Prize
| Alone with Everybody| Album of the Year
| 
|-
| rowspan=2|NME Awards
| rowspan=2|Himself
| rowspan=2|Best Solo Artist
| 
|-
| 2006
| 
|-
| 2011
| UK Music Video Awards
| Live at Shepherds Bush Empire| Best Live Music Coverage
| 
|-
| 2017
| NME Awards
| rowspan=3|Himself
| Best British Male 
| 
|-
| rowspan=2|2019
| Global Awards
| Best Indie 
| 
|-
| Ivor Novello Awards
| Outstanding Contribution to British Music
| 

Discography
Albums

Project album

Extended plays

Singles

Other releases

Guest appearances

Notes
A ^ United Nations of Sound'' and the singles taken from it were released under Ashcroft's pseudonym "RPA & The United Nations of Sound".
B ^ "Why Not Nothing?" / "Sweet Brother Malcolm" was a limited 7" release.
C ^ "The Journey" was a charity single for Helen Bamber Foundation.
D ^ "Are You Ready?" was a released as a limited edition UK promo CD and vinyl.

References

External links

Official website (UK) 
Richard Ashcroft Online (unofficial website)

1971 births
Living people
Alternative rock guitarists
Alternative rock singers
British alternative rock musicians
English male guitarists
English male singers
English rock singers
English songwriters
Music in the Metropolitan Borough of Wigan
Musicians from Manchester
Parlophone artists
People from Higher End
Shoegaze musicians
Space rock musicians
The Verve members
Virgin Records artists
Ivor Novello Award winners
Britpop musicians